The vexillum (plural vexilla) was a flag-like object used as a military standard by units in the Ancient Roman army.

Use in Roman army

The word vexillum is a derivative of the Latin word, velum, meaning a sail, which confirms the historical evidence (from coins and sculpture) that vexilla were literally "little sails": flag-like standards. In the vexillum, the cloth was draped from a horizontal crossbar suspended from a staff. That is unlike most modern flags in which the "hoist" of the cloth is attached directly to a vertical staff. The bearer of a vexillum was known as a vexillarius or vexillifer.

Just as in the case of the regimental colors or flags of early modern Western regiments, the vexillum was a treasured symbol of the military unit that it represented and it was closely defended in combat. It was the main standard of some types of units, especially cavalry; however, it was regarded as less important than a legion's aquila, or eagle, and may have represented a subdivision of a legion. However, that is not entirely clear from surviving sources (see vexillatio).

The only existent Roman military vexillum is dated to the first half of the 3rd century AD and is housed in the Pushkin Museum of Fine Arts. It is an almost square piece of coarse linen cloth with the image of the goddess Victoria and measures 47×50 cm. The lower edge has the remains of a fringe. The vexillum was once attached to a piece of reed wood. It is unknown to which military unit the vexillum belonged. The vexillum was found in Egypt shortly before 1911, but its exact provenance is also unclear.

Appearance

It is sometimes reported that the vexillum of the Ancient Roman Republic was red in colour and had the letters SPQR (which means "the Senate and People of Rome") in yellow on it, however "it is difficult to find any evidence that they were ever on military flags carried by the army." This is simply the appearance of the only vexillum discovered so far, and it may not be consistent across other vexilla.

General and later use

The term vexillum (plural vexilla) is used more generally for any object, such as a relic or icon, used as a standard in battle, and may be considered the offensive equivalent of the more defensive palladium in this context.

Vexillology, or the study of flags, derives its name from this word and a vexilloid is a standard that is not of conventional flag form.

Nearly all of the present-day regions of Italy preserve the use of vexilla. Many Christian processional banners are in the vexillum form; usually these banners are termed labara after the standard adopted by the first Christian Roman emperor Constantine I replaced the usual spear point with the "Chi-Rho" symbol ☧. For example, a vexillum is used by the Legion of Mary as the term for its standards.  A small version is used on the altar and a larger one leads processions. In the Middle Ages, the type of banner draped from a horizontal crossbar became known as a gonfalon.

See also

 Vexilla Regis, early Christian hymn whose first line uses this word, referring to the cross as a standard
 Gonfalon

In taxonomy
 Vexillum (botany), the large upper petal of a papilionaceous flower
 Vexillum (gastropod), a genus of snails in the family Costellariidae
 Inquisitor vexillum,  a sea snail species

References

External links

 Luca's Fabrica

Ancient Roman military standards
History of flags